The enzyme formyl-CoA hydrolase (EC 3.1.2.10) catalyzes the reaction 

formyl-CoA + H2O  CoA + formate

This enzyme belongs to the family of hydrolases, specifically those acting on thioester bonds.  The systematic name is formyl-CoA hydrolase. This enzyme is also called formyl coenzyme A hydrolase.  This enzyme participates in glyoxylate and dicarboxylate metabolism.

References

 

EC 3.1.2
Enzymes of unknown structure